Kosovo competed at the 2022 Winter Olympics in Beijing, China, from 4 to 20 February 2022.

Kosovo's team consists of two alpine skiers (one man and one woman). This marks the first time Kosovo has a female competitor on its Winter Olympics team. Both skiers were the country's flagbearer during the opening ceremony. However, because Kryeziu was identified as a close contact of one of the team's coaches infected with SARS-CoV-2 before the opening ceremony, only Tahiri was able to serve as the team's opening ceremony flag bearer. Meanwhile a volunteer was the flagbearer during the closing ceremony.

Competitors 
The following is the list of number of competitors participating at the Games per sport/discipline.

Alpine skiing

By meeting the basic qualification standards, Kosovo qualified one male and one female alpine skier.

References

Nations at the 2022 Winter Olympics
2022
Winter Olympics